The Cash Money Millionaires (also known as The Millionaires) were a supergroup of Cash Money recording artists from New Orleans, Louisiana, formed in 1996 and disbanded in 2001. The group was composed of the Big Tymer$ (Birdman and Mannie Fresh) and the Hot Boy$ (B.G., Lil Wayne, Juvenile and Turk). The Cash Money Millionaires went on numerous tours, including tours with the Ruff Ryders and Nelly. In September 2000, the Millionaires released a soundtrack album to Baller Blockin' in which they starred. In 2001, the group disbanded due to monetary issues.

Discography

Soundtrack albums
 Baller Blockin' (2000)

Instrumental albums
 Platinum Instrumentals (2000)

Singles
 "Baller Blockin'" with E-40 (2000)

Filmography
 Baller Blockin' (2000)
 Rich Gang The Movie (TBA)
 Tapout (2020)
 50 Plates (2020)
  The Rich Gang 2 : Lifestyle (TBA)
 Baller Blockin' 2 (TBA)

References

External links
 Cash Money Records official website Cash Money/Universal

Cash Money Records artists
Southern hip hop groups
Hip hop collectives
Hip hop supergroups
Musical groups established in 1996
Musical groups disestablished in 2001
African-American musical groups
Musical groups from New Orleans
Gangsta rap groups